DARC or Darc may refer to:

Acronym
 DARC (gene)
 Data Radio Channel
 Dayton Area Rugby Club
 Deutscher Amateur-Radio-Club
 Duke Annual Robo-Climb Competition
 Durham Amateur Rowing Club

People
Daniel Darc (1959–2013), French singer
Mireille Darc (1938–2017), French model and actress

See also
Darc (film), a 2018 American thriller filme
Darcs, a distributed version control system
Dark